Vidas Kupčinskas (born January 24, 1971) is a Lithuanian sprint canoer who competed in the mid-1990s. At the 1996 Summer Olympics in Atlanta, he was eliminated in the semifinals of both the K-2 500 m and the K-2 1000 m events.

References
Sports-Reference.com profile

1971 births
Canoeists at the 1996 Summer Olympics
Living people
Lithuanian male canoeists
Olympic canoeists of Lithuania